Mary Ellen Ruffalo ( Keaggy, August 29, 1929 – 2017), better known as Mary Ellen Kay, was an American television and film actress.

Biography
Kay was born in Boardman, Ohio on August 29, 1929. She was one of ten siblings, and the sister of virtuoso guitarist Phil Keaggy. Her brother credits her for introducing him to the Christian faith. Before she became an actress, Kay was a singer, beginning at age 6. Later, she toured with Gene Ryan's orchestra, and when she was 17 she was a headliner in supper clubs. Her initial acting experience came in Little Theatre productions in the Hollywood area. Kay co-starred with Rex Allen in 19 western films.

She married her second husband, Tim Ruffalo in 1963. They had one son, Bill, and remained together until his death from a stroke in 1993. In an interview dated August 14, 2018, Kay's brother, Phil Keaggy, stated that Mary Ellen had died in 2017, at the age of 87.

Selected filmography

 Girls' School (1950)
 Streets of Ghost Town (1950)
 Tarzan and the Slave Girl (1950) 
 Fort Dodge Stampede (1951)
 Desert of Lost Men (1951)
 Rodeo King and the Senorita (1951) 
 Silver City Bonanza (1951)
 Government Agents vs. Phantom Legion (serial) (1951)
 Colorado Sundown (1952)
 The Last Musketeer (1952)
 Vice Squad (1953)
 Yukon Vengeance (1954)
 The Long Wait (1954)
 Thunder Pass (1954)
 Runaway Daughters (1956)
 Voodoo Woman (1957)
 Buffalo Gun (1961)

References

Bibliography
 Bernard A. Drew. Motion Picture Series and Sequels: A Reference Guide. Routledge, 2013.

External links

1929 births
2017 deaths
20th-century American actresses
21st-century American women
American film actresses
People from Boardman, Ohio